Amsa station is a subway station on Line 8 of the Seoul Metropolitan Subway. The station is located in the Amsa and Cheonho neighborhoods in Gangdong District, Seoul. The station is the Northern terminus of the line and is approximately 31 minutes by train from Moran station, the Southern terminus. There is a planned extension to be completed by 2023 to Byeollae on the Gyeongchun Line or even further to ByeollaeByeolgaram on Line 4.

History
 July 2, 1999: Along with the opening of Seoul Subway Line 8, operations began as the terminus of the line.

Station layout

References

Railway stations in South Korea opened in 1999
Seoul Metropolitan Subway stations
Metro stations in Gangdong District